Rudbarak or Rud Barak may refer to:
 Rudbarak, Gilan
 Rudbarak, Mazandaran
 Rudbarak-e Bala, Semnan Province
 Rudbarak-e Pain, Semnan Province
Rud Barak, Tehran

See also
 Rudbar (disambiguation)